Nordic combined at the 1984 Winter Olympics, consisted of one event, held from 11 February to 12 February. The ski jumping portion took place at Igman Olympic Jumps, while the cross-country portion took place at Igman.

Medal summary

Medal table

Events

Individual

Athletes did three normal hill ski jumps, with the lowest score dropped. They then raced a 15 kilometre cross-country course, with the time converted to points. The athlete with the highest combined points score was awarded the gold medal.

Participating NOCs

Eleven nations participated in nordic combined at the Sarajevo Games.

References

External links
 Sports-Reference - 1984 Olympics - Nordic Combined - Individual

 
1984 Winter Olympics events
1984
1984 in Nordic combined
Nordic combined competitions in Yugoslavia
Men's events at the 1984 Winter Olympics